Chuzhou railway station is a high-speed railway station in Nanqiao District, Chuzhou, Anhui, People's Republic of China. It is served by the Jinghu High-Speed Railway.

See also 
Chuzhou North railway station

References

Railway stations in Anhui
Railway stations in China opened in 2011